The Ipf is a primarily treeless mountain ( high), near Bopfingen, Ostalbkreis, Baden-Württemberg, Germany with a prehistoric hill fort on its top.

The fort is situated on an isolated hill, with a flattened summit surrounded by a stone wall, ditch and large counterscarp (outer bank). Extensive ramparts traverse the slopes to protect a large enclosed area and entranceway. There is evidence of occupation from the Bronze Age (Urnfield culture) through the Iron Age to the early Celtic La Tene period, a span of almost a thousand years (1200 BC – 300 BC). The summit was already levelled, fortified and densely settled in the Urnfield period. During the early Iron Age Hallstatt period and into the early La Tène period the Ipf was an important 'princely seat' – a regional centre of power and aristocratic residence with long-distance trade connections, including with Greece and Italy.

Gallery

See also
 Urnfield culture
 Hallstatt culture
 La Tene culture
 Heuneburg
 Hochdorf Chieftain's Grave
 Hohenasperg
 Glauberg
 Vix Grave
 Burgstallkogel
 Ipf bei Bopfingen German-language wikipedia page with more information
 Alte Burg (Langenenslingen)
 Magdalenenberg
 Lavau Grave
 Oppidum of Manching

External links
 Mount Ipf in southern Germany. The fortification, spatial organization and territory of a “Princely Seat” of the Early Iron Age (Krause 2021)
 Crossing the Alps: Early Urbanism between Northern Italy and Central Europe (900-400 BC), Edited by Lorenzo Zamboni, Manuel Fernández-Götz & Carola Metzner-Nebelsick (2020) Includes a visual reconstruction of the Ipf hillfort.
 Digital animation/ reconstruction of the Ipf hillfort
 Ipf

References

Archaeological sites in Germany
Buildings and structures in Baden-Württemberg
Former populated places in Germany
Mountains and hills of Baden-Württemberg
Hill forts in Germany